River Ock may refer to

in England
River Ock, Devon, a former name of the River Okement
River Ock, Oxfordshire, a tributary of the Thames
River Ock, Surrey, a tributary of the River Wey